is an East Japan Railway Company (JR East) railway station located in the city of Takizawa, Iwate Prefecture, Japan.

Lines
Ōkama Station is served by the Tazawako Line, and is located 6.0 km from the terminus of the line at Morioka Station.

Station layout
Ōkama Station has two tracks. Track 1 is served by a side platform, on the station building side, and track 2 is served by an island platform with one side fenced off. Only track 1 is in normal use, and serves traffic in both directions.

Track 2 is fitted with a snow-melting device, which sprays hot water on the undercarriage of trains. In the winter, Tokyo-bound Akita Shinkansen trains stop here to have snow removed before they enter the Tōhoku Shinkansen at Morioka, since accumulated snow and ice on the undercarriage could cause damage if it broke off while the train was running at high speed.

Platforms

History
Ōkama Station opened on June 25, 1921. The station was absorbed into the JR East network upon the privatization of the JNR on April 1, 1987.

Passenger statistics
In fiscal 2015, the station was used by an average of 484 passengers daily (boarding passengers only).

Surrounding area
  National Route 46
 Takezawa City Office
Shizukuishi River

See also
 List of Railway Stations in Japan

References

External links

  

Railway stations in Iwate Prefecture
Takizawa, Iwate
Tazawako Line
Railway stations in Japan opened in 1921
Stations of East Japan Railway Company